Dangerous Love is a 1988 American crime film starring Elliott Gould, Lawrence Monoson and Brenda Bakke.

Plot
A psychopath videotapes then murders female clients of a dating service, and suspicion falls on a geeky computer executive.

Cast 
 Elliott Gould as Rick 
 Lawrence Monoson as Gabe
 Brenda Bakke as Chris
 Angelyne as Josie
 Peter Marc Jacobson as Jay  
 Teri Austin as Dominique
 Sal Landi as Rob
 Anthony Geary as Mickey 
 Kimberley Kates as  Susan

Reception
Leonard Maltin rated the movie a "bomb".

References

External links 
 

1988 films
1980s serial killer films
American crime films
1980s English-language films
1980s American films